Dradition Pro-Wrestling (Dradition) is an independent Japanese professional wrestling promotion that, until 2008, was known as Muga World Pro Wrestling. The promotion was founded by and is owned by puroresu legend Tatsumi Fujinami, who has owned and operated it since its creation in August 2006.

The name of the promotion is a portmanteau of the words "tradition" and "dragon": the first term refers to the type of traditional wrestling promoted by Dradition, the so-called Inoki's "strong style", the second one is referred to Fujinami's nickname "The Dragon".

They run, on average, one show every 2–3 months and feature their talent as well as participation from other promotions including Dramatic Dream Team, Ice Ribbon and SMASH, usually freelancers but now & then with participation from the major federations. Some of their talent frequently appears elsewhere as well.

Championships

Roster

Hiro Saito
Leona
Mitsuya Nagai

Nobuyuki Kurashima
Tatsumi Fujinami

Guests

Daisuke Sekimoto
Yukio Sakaguchi
Tiger Mask III

Nosawa Rongai
Emi Sakura
Mark Mercedes

See also

Professional wrestling in Japan
List of professional wrestling promotions in Japan

References

External links

Japanese professional wrestling promotions
2006 establishments in Japan
Entertainment companies established in 2006
Companies based in Tokyo